Marta Mendía Valencia (born 18 May 1975 in Burlada, Navarra) is a former high jumper from Spain. Her personal best jumps are 1.95 metres outdoors and 1.96 metres indoors.

Competition record

References

External links
 
 

1975 births
Living people
Spanish female high jumpers
Athletes (track and field) at the 2000 Summer Olympics
Athletes (track and field) at the 2004 Summer Olympics
Olympic athletes of Spain
Mediterranean Games bronze medalists for Spain
Mediterranean Games medalists in athletics
Athletes (track and field) at the 2005 Mediterranean Games
Competitors at the 1999 Summer Universiade
Sportspeople from Navarre
People from Cuenca de Pamplona